Matthew Berkowitz is an American film director, writer, and producer. He has written and directed three feature films (Wild in Blue, A Violent Man, The Madness Inside Me).

Early life and career 
Berkowitz went to Pitzer College in Claremont, California, where he studied philosophy and film. He cites Brian De Palma, Alfred Hitchcock, Lars von Trier and Gaspar Noé as some of his cinematic influences. 

Berkowitz made his screenwriting and directing debut in 2015 with his psychological thriller film Wild in Blue starring Frank Cermak Jr., Daveigh Chase, Karen Black, Charlotte Price, Marcos Mateo Ochoa, and Steve Railsback. The film gained attention with what the filmmakers dubbed "terrorist marketing" when they attempted to purchase a billboard advertisement on Sunset Boulevard featuring a still from the film depicting Chase in a pose that they knew would be rejected by the advertising company. The rejection was reported by several media outlets, including TMZ. Wild in Blue received several awards, including Best Feature Film at the 2015 St. Tropez International Film Festival and Best Director and Best Lead Actor at the 2015 Madrid International Film Festival.

Later Berkowitz wrote and directed the neo-noir thriller film A Violent Man, which starred Thomas Q. Jones, Isaach de Bankolé, Chuck Liddell, and Denise Richards. A Violent Man had its world premiere at the 2017 Oldenburg International Film Festival and its U.S. premiere at the 2018 Miami Film Festival, with the Miami Film Festival guide stating that "director Matthew Berkowitz’s second outing speaks to the power of film noir to shine a light on the base impulses brewing below our civilized exteriors." Alan Ng of Film Threat called the film "a testament to how filmmakers can tell big stories with small budgets."

Berkowitz also wrote and directed the psychological thriller The Madness Inside Me starring Merrin Dungey, Devon Graye, Thomas Q. Jones, John Buffalo Mailer, and Anthony DeSando. It premiered at the 2020 Oldenburg International Film Festival. The Madness Inside Me was later acquired by Gravitas Ventures and was released on digital platforms, Blu-ray, and DVD on September 3, 2021. Anthony Francis of Screen Comment called The Madness Inside Me "Well-directed and extremely well-written" and wrote, "Berkowitz’s film swims in territories previously explored by filmmakers as varied as Brian De Palma, Roman Polanski, David Cronenberg, and Luis Buñuel."

Berkowitz has also produced several films including Ms. Long Legs, written and directed by Academy Award nominated screenwriter Milo Addica, DieRy, Corbin Nash, and The Queen of Hollywood Blvd.

Filmography

Films

Short films

Awards and nominations

References

External links 

Living people
Year of birth missing (living people)
American male screenwriters
Film directors from Los Angeles
American film producers
American television executives
Pitzer College alumni
Daytime Emmy Award winners